Hillsborough may refer to:

Australia
Hillsborough, New South Wales, a suburb of Lake Macquarie

Canada
Hillsborough, New Brunswick
Hillsborough Parish, New Brunswick
Hillsborough, Nova Scotia, in Inverness County
Hillsborough (electoral district), a defunct Prince Edward Island federal electoral district
Rural Municipality of Hillsborough No. 132, Saskatchewan

Grenada
Hillsborough, Carriacou

Ireland
 Hillsborough (Parliament of Ireland constituency)

New Zealand
 Hillsborough, Auckland
 Hillsborough, Christchurch, a suburb

United Kingdom
Hillsborough, County Down, Northern Ireland
Hillsborough, County Down (civil parish)
Hillsborough Castle, the State residence in Northern Ireland
Hillsborough, Devon, England
Hillsborough, Sheffield, a suburb
Sheffield Hillsborough (UK Parliament constituency)
Hillsborough (ward), a ward electing 3 members to Sheffield City Council
Hillsborough Stadium, home of Sheffield Wednesday football club
Hillsborough disaster, a 1989 crush which killed 97 football spectators
Hillsborough (1996 film), depicting the Hillsborough disaster
Hillsborough (2014 film), a television film about the disaster

United States

Hillsborough, California
Hillsborough County, Florida
Hillsborough, Maryland
Hillsborough, New Hampshire, a New England town
Hillsborough (CDP), New Hampshire, the main village in the town
Hillsborough County, New Hampshire
Hillsborough Township, New Jersey
Hillsborough, North Carolina
Hillsborough Historic District, North Carolina

Other uses 
Hillsborough (East Indiaman), several ships

See also 
Hillsboro (disambiguation)